Ceratoperidinium margalefii, also known as Ceratoperidinium yeye, is a species of dinoflagellates. This species has two flagella. Their resemblance to the legs of a girl dancing inspired its original name, Ceratoperidinium yeye, in reference to the female-dominated yé-yé pop music and dance of the 1960s.

References

Species described in 1969
Gymnodiniales